The fifth season of Private Practice premiered on September 29, 2011. It was announced on February 9, 2011, that Audra McDonald, who plays the character Naomi Bennett, will not return as a regular cast member in the fifth season, however she may return as a guest star or a recurring character.

Following the departure of Audra McDonald, it was announced on March 20, 2011, that actor Benjamin Bratt will be added to the series as a regular cast member for the fifth season. The details of his character were released on August 7, as he is set to play Jake Reilly, an accomplished fertility specialist that is knowledgeable in cutting-edge technology and procedures.

Later in the season, Cooper Freedman was revealed to have had an 8-year-old son from a previous one-night stand. Son Mason is portrayed by child actor Griffin Gluck. While Gluck initially served as a guest star, he was promoted to series regular later on in the season. Gluck is notable for being the first child to be a series regular in Private Practice or in the original series Grey's Anatomy.

Cast

Casting
Following the renewal of Private Practice, it was announced that Benjamin Bratt would be returning to the show as a series regular, and his character was reviewed to be named, Jake Reilly. It was also announced that Audra McDonald would not be returning as a series regular, but instead could possible return as a recurring cast member. The remaining regular cast including, Kate Walsh, Tim Daly, Paul Adelstein, KaDee Strickland, Brian Benben, Caterina Scorsone, Taye Diggs, and Amy Brenneman all returned in their roles as series regulars. In September 2011, it was announced that My So Called Life actress, A.J. Langer, was cast as Erica Warner, a recurring role as a woman who shows up in Cooper's life proclaiming they have an eight-year-old son together. It was later announced that Griffin Gluck was cast as Mason Warner, the son that Cooper and Erica share together. Later in the season, Griffin was billed as a series regular, while A.J. stayed as a recurring character as her character died. In November 2011, it was announced that Stephen Amell had been cast as Scott Becker, a paramedic that was also a potential love interest for Violet, seeing as Violet and Pete decided to split up after Pete's heart attack.

In November 2011, Wes Brown had a recurring role as Ryan Kerrigan, a drug addict and a potential love interest for Amelia, but his character eventually dies pursuing Amelia to go to rehab. In November 2011, it was announced that, Jessie star, Debby Ryan would be making a special guest appearance, as Hailey, a girl that Amelia meets while she is going through rehab for drug addiction. In January 2012, it was announced that Private Practice and Grey's Anatomy would be having another crossover, and Patrick Dempsey and Chyler Leigh would be making a special guest appearance in an episode in an effort to save Erica's life. In February 2012, it was announced that Anika Noni Rose had been cast in a recurring role as Corinne Bennett, who would play Sam's sister who drops in town for a visit.

Development
On January 10, 2011, ABC renewed Private Practice for a fifth season. The fifth season premiered on September 29, 2011.

A plot device this season sees most episodes begin with Addison at a therapist's office introducing the episode while most but not all end with a redux of the plot device although Kate Walsh does not narrate the actual episodes. In the beginning of the season a major part of the story-line is Amelia's drug addiction, and how all of the doctors work to try to save her. Another story-line in the beginning of the season is the practice going under, and trying to save it and Violet trying to get her medical license back. A major story-line that has been in place since the fourth season, is Addison trying to have a baby with IVF treatments, but after the IVF treatments fail and she no longer has any eggs left, she decides to adopt a baby, eventually adopting a baby named Henry, who she delivered the very same day she was called about adopting him. A plot that took place for the entire season, is Cooper finding out that he has a son and that the mother, Erica Warner, has an inoperable brain tumor, and how Cooper and Charlotte must deal with the death of Erica and how it affects Mason. Through the middle of the season, Pete and Violet decide that they should go through separation; Violet tries to move on with a relationship with Scott, a paramedic she met, but the relationship eventually ends when Scott ends it and Violet decides to try to work things out with Pete. The addition of a new character, Jake Reilly, opened up the story-line of Addison trying to figure out if she wants to pursue a relationship with Sam or with Jake. After Amelias' drug addiction story-line, it's found out that Amelia is pregnant, and she has to deal with finding out that her baby (who was conceived while Amelia was actively using drugs) was developing without a brain and would not survive; she decides to carry it to term to donate the organs. Amelia also dealt with her anger at Addison while having Jake be her doctor.

Cast and characters

Main cast
 Kate Walsh as Addison Montgomery
 Tim Daly as Pete Wilder
 Benjamin Bratt as Jake Reilly
 Paul Adelstein as Cooper Freedman
 KaDee Strickland as Charlotte King
 Brian Benben as Sheldon Wallace
 Caterina Scorsone as Amelia Shepherd
 Griffin Gluck as Mason Warner
 Taye Diggs as Sam Bennett
 Amy Brenneman as Violet Turner

Recurring cast
 A.J. Langer as Erica Warner
 Stephen Amell as Scott Becker 
 Anika Noni Rose as Corinne Bennett 
Scott Alan Smith as Addison's Therapist
Jack Bobo and Joey Bobo as Lucas Wilder
 Aloma Wright as Mildred Clemons 
 Emily Rios as Angela Reilly 
 Betsy Brandt as Joanna Gibbs 
 Michael B. Silver as David Gibbs
 Wes Brown as Ryan Kerrigan
 Sydney Tamiia Poitier as Michelle
 Blue Deckert as Joe Price
 Myk Watford as Billy Douglas
 Emily Moss Wilson as Judi
 Billy John Malone as Hendricks

Special guest stars
 Patrick Dempsey as Derek Shepherd
 Chyler Leigh as Lexie Grey

Guest stars
 Patrick Fabian as Robert Weston
 Debby Ryan as Hailey

Episodes

Ratings

Live ratings

DVD release

References

2011 American television seasons
2012 American television seasons
Private Practice (TV series) seasons